The Baranagar to Barrackpore,  metro corridor (Line 5) in North 24 Parganas, is another line of Kolkata Metro, was sanctioned in 2009, at a cost of Rs.2070 crore, to enable a quicker commute from the northern suburbs to Kolkata, via North Kolkata.

Route

Map

Stations (South to North) 
The stations in this line are:

Proposed realignment 
State government proposed for realigning the line via Kalyani Expressway, instead of B.T. Road, due to the presence of arterial water pipelines, that supply water to the city, below BT Road. The construction might create huge traffic jam along the road and also damage the water pipelines, which will cutoff the city's water supply.

See also
List of Kolkata Metro stations
Kolkata Metro rolling stock
Lists of rapid transit systems
Trams in Kolkata
Kolkata Light Rail Transit
Kolkata Monorail
Kolkata Suburban Railway

References

Kolkata Metro lines
Kolkata Metro
750 V DC railway electrification